Historical rankings of chancellors of Germany are surveys conducted to construct rankings of the success and popularity of the individuals who have served as Chancellor of Germany in the Federal Republic of Germany.

Opinion polls

Overview

Opinion poll rankings of the greatest chancellor 

^ Following Willy Brandt's resignation as Chancellor, Walter Scheel was acting Chancellor for nine days.

Opinion poll rankings of the most important chancellor 

^ Following Willy Brandt's resignation as Chancellor, Walter Scheel was acting Chancellor for nine days.

ZDF (2003) 
For the TV show Unsere Besten, more than 1 million Germans were asked to rank the 100 most notable Germans in an unrepresentative opinion poll. The list also included German chancellors:

Konrad Adenauer (#1 overall)
 Willy Brandt (#5)
 Helmut Kohl (#13)
 Helmut Schmidt (#21)
 Ludwig Erhard (#27)
 Gerhard Schröder (#82)
Neither Kurt Georg Kiesinger nor Angela Merkel (who was leader of the opposition at that time) were ranked among the 100 most notable Germans.

Forsa (2005) 
In an opinion poll conducted by Forsa in July 2005, the 1002 pollees were supposed to name the most notable German chancellor:
 Konrad Adenauer – 35%
 Willy Brandt – 20%
 Helmut Schmidt – 18%
 Helmut Kohl – 17%
 Ludwig Erhard – 5%
 Gerhard Schröder – 1%
 Kurt Georg Kiesinger – 0%
The poll didn't include Chancellor Angela Merkel, since she had only assumed office in November 2005.

Emnid (2005) 
In an opinion poll from November 2005, the polling company Emnid asked for the best German chancellor:
 Helmut Schmidt – 28%
 Helmut Kohl – 18%
 Konrad Adenauer – 17%
 Willy Brandt – 15%
 Gerhard Schröder – 10%
 Ludwig Erhard – 3%
 Kurt Georg Kiesinger – 1%
The poll didn't include Chancellor Angela Merkel, since she had only assumed office in November 2005.

Infratest dimap (2010) 
In March 2010, Infratest dimap asked 1500 people for their view of the term in office of German chancellors. The given numbers show the percentage of people agreeing with the statement that the named chancellor was a good one:
 Helmut Schmidt – 75%
 Willy Brandt – 68%
 Angela Merkel – 67%
 Helmut Kohl – 59%
 Gerhard Schröder – 47%
The poll didn't include the first three German chancellors (Adenauer, Erhard, Kiesinger).

Forsa (2013) 
In December 2013, Forsa asked 1002 Germans to name the most notable German chancellor:
 Helmut Schmidt – 25%
 Konrad Adenauer – 23%
 Willy Brandt – 18%
 Helmut Kohl – 17%
 Angela Merkel – 6%
 Gerhard Schröder – 3%
 Ludwig Erhard – 2%
 Kurt Georg Kiesinger – 0%

YouGov (2015) 
In May 2015, YouGov asked 1111 Germans to name the best German chancellor in their opinion:
 Helmut Schmidt – 24%
 Konrad Adenauer and Angela Merkel – 18%
 Willy Brandt – 15%
 Helmut Kohl – 9%
 Gerhard Schröder – 5%
 Ludwig Erhard – 4%
 Kurt Georg Kiesinger – 1%

See also
Historical rankings of prime ministers of Australia
Historical rankings of prime ministers of Canada
Historical rankings of prime ministers of the Netherlands
Historical rankings of prime ministers of the United Kingdom
Historical rankings of presidents of the United States

References

Further reading
 Helms, Ludger. "Revisiting the German chancellorship: leadership weakness and democratic autocracy in the Federal Republic." in Poor Leadership and Bad Governance (Edward Elgar Publishing, 2012).

 Klein, Herbert, ed. 1993. The German Chancellors. Berlin: Edition.
 Padgett, Stephen, ed. 1994. The Development of the German Chancellorship: Adenauer to Kohl. London: Hurst.

 
Germany
Political history of Germany